The 1954 Five Nations Championship was the twenty-fifth series of the rugby union Five Nations Championship. Including the previous incarnations as the Home Nations and Five Nations, this was the sixtieth series of the northern hemisphere rugby union championship. Ten matches were played between 9 January and 10 April. It was contested by England, France, Ireland, Scotland and Wales. Wales, England and France shared the championship; this marked France's first title. England won the Triple Crown and the Calcutta Cup.

Participants
The teams involved were:

Table

Results

This was the last Ireland international played at Ravenhill until 2007. Players from the Republic of Ireland threatened not to line out for the UK anthem unless their anthem and flag were also used. The IRFU resolved the issue by moving all future home matches to Dublin.

References

External links

The official RBS Six Nations Site

Six Nations Championship seasons
Five Nations
Five Nations 
Five Nations
Five Nations
Five Nations
Five Nations
Five Nations
Five Nations
Five Nations
Five Nations